This is an incomplete list of the tallest structures that are built in the former Soviet Union.

Tallest structures

Very tall structures of unknown height
There are some facilities in Russia and other parts of former Soviet Union, which may use permanent man-made structures taller than 250 metres. As some of them are of military importance, no height data are currently available. These facilities include the following stations:

 Alpha transmitter Revda
 Alpha transmitter Seyda
 Large chimney of Karagandinskaya TÈC-3
 Chimneys of Rustavi Metallurgical Plant (2 chimneys – an estimate over 200 m high)

If one could find out the height of the mentioned structures, then put them in the upper list, if the height is greater than 250 metres.

Tall structures characteristic for former Soviet Union 
There are several types of tall structures, which were either only or mainly built
in former Soviet Union.

Stalinistic skyscrapers 
Skyscrapers built during Stalin's last years (1947–1953) in an elaborate combination of Russian Baroque and Gothic styles
(see Seven Sisters (Moscow)). Similar buildings less tall were built in several other cities in former Soviet Union.

Guyed Masts with crossbars 
Between 1960 and 1965 in several cities in Russia and Ukraine guyed masts with crossbars
running from the mastbody to the guys were built. All these masts, which are known as 30107 KM, are exclusively used for
UHF-/VHF-transmission ( mainly FM-/TV-transmission) and have a closed tubular mast body.

Hyperbolic towers built by Shukhov 
Vladimir Shukhov built between 1900 and 1930 several hyperbolic lattice towers
for different uses at several places.

Other 
In nearly all larger towns in the former Soviet Union, there is a lattice tower of type 3803 KM

See also
 List of tallest buildings in Moscow
 List of tallest structures in Central Asia
 List of tallest buildings in Kazakhstan
 List of tallest structures in Turkmenistan
 List of tallest buildings in Asia

References 

Skyscrapers in Russia
Soviet Union
Soviet Union
Tallest
Tallest